The 1950 Columbia Lions football team was an American football team that represented Columbia University as an independent during the 1950 college football season. 

In their 21st season under head coach Lou Little, the Lions compiled a 4–5 record, and were outscored 169 to 151. Albert Nork was the team captain.  

Columbia played its home games at Baker Field in Upper Manhattan, in New York City.

Schedule

References

Columbia
Columbia Lions football seasons
Columbia Lions football